The Reith Lectures is a series of annual BBC radio lectures given by leading figures of the day. They are commissioned by the BBC and broadcast on Radio 4 and the World Service. The lectures were inaugurated in 1948 to mark the historic contribution made to public service broadcasting by Lord Reith, the corporation's first director-general.

Reith maintained that broadcasting should be a public service that aimed to enrich the intellectual and cultural life of the nation. It is in this spirit that the BBC each year invites a leading figure to deliver the lectures. The aim is to advance public understanding and debate about issues of contemporary interest.

The first Reith lecturer was the philosopher and later Nobel laureate, Bertrand Russell. The first female lecturer was Dame Margery Perham in 1961. The youngest Reith lecturer was Colin Blakemore, who was 32 in 1976 when he broadcast over six episodes on the brain and consciousness.

The Reith Lectures archive

In June 2011 BBC Radio 4 published its Reith Lectures archive. This included two podcasts featuring over 240 lectures from 1948 to the present day as well as streamed online audio, and the complete written transcripts of the entire Reith Lectures archive:

 Podcast 1: Archive 1948–1975
 Podcast 2: Archive 1976–2012
 Transcripts 1948–2010 
 In pictures

The BBC found that some of the audio archive of the Reith Lectures was missing from its library and appealed to the public for copies of the missing lectures.

The Reith Lectures 1948–2020

1940s 
 1948 Bertrand Russell, Authority and the Individual
 1949 Robert Birley, Britain in Europe

1950s 
 1950 John Zachary Young, Doubt and Certainty in Science
 1951 Lord Radcliffe, Power and the State
 1952 Arnold J. Toynbee, The World and the West
 1953 Robert Oppenheimer, Science and the Common Understanding
 1954 Oliver Franks, Britain and the Tide of World Affairs
 1955 Nikolaus Pevsner, The Englishness of English Art
 1956 Edward Victor Appleton, Science and the Nation
 1957 George F. Kennan, Russia, the Atom and the West
 1958 Bernard Lovell, The Individual and the Universe
 1959 Peter Medawar, The Future of Man

1960s 
 1960 Edgar Wind, Art and Anarchy
 1961 Margery Perham, The Colonial Reckoning
 1962 George Carstairs, This Island Now
 1963 Albert Sloman, A University in the Making
 1964 Leon Bagrit, The Age of Automation
 1965 Robert Gardiner, World of Peoples
 1966 John K. Galbraith, The New Industrial State
 1967 Edmund Leach, A Runaway World
 1968 Lester Pearson, In the Family of Man
 1969 Frank Fraser Darling, Wilderness and Plenty

1970s 
 1970 Donald Schon, Change and Industrial Society
 1971 Richard Hoggart, Only Connect
 1972 Andrew Shonfield, Europe: Journey to an Unknown Destination
 1973 Alastair Buchan, Change Without War
 1974 Ralf Dahrendorf, The New Liberty
 1975 Daniel Boorstin, America and the World Experience
 1976 Colin Blakemore, Mechanics of the Mind
 1977 A. H. Halsey, Change in British Society
 1978 Edward Norman, Christianity and the World
 1979 Ali Mazrui, The African Condition

1980s 
 1980 Professor Sir Ian Kennedy, Unmasking Medicine
 1981 Laurence Martin, The Two Edged Sword
 1982 Denis Donoghue, The Arts Without Mystery
 1983 Douglas Wass, Government and the Governed
 1984 John Searle, Minds, Brains and Science
 1985 David Henderson, Innocence and Design
 1986 Lord McCluskey, Law, Justice and Democracy
 1987 Alexander Goehr, The Survival of the Symphony
 1988 Geoffrey Hosking, The Rediscovery of Politics
 1989 , Beyond the Tunnel of History

1990s 
 1990 Jonathan Sacks, The Persistence of Faith
 1991 Steve Jones, The Language of Genes
 There was no lecture in 1992 because "the BBC simply couldn't find anyone to do them"
 1993 Edward Said, Representation of the Intellectual
 1994 Marina Warner, Managing Monsters
 1995 Richard Rogers, Sustainable City
 1996 Jean Aitchison, The Language Web
 1997 Patricia Williams, The Genealogy of Race
 1998 John Keegan, War in Our World
 1999 Anthony Giddens, The Runaway World

2000s 
 2000 Chris Patten, Sir John Browne, Thomas Lovejoy, Gro Harlem Brundtland, Vandana Shiva, Charles, Prince of Wales, Respect for the Earth 	
 2001 Tom Kirkwood, The End of Age
 2002 Onora O'Neill, A Question of Trust?
 2003 Vilayanur S. Ramachandran, The Emerging Mind
 2004 Wole Soyinka, Climate of Fear
 2005 Lord Broers, The Triumph of Technology
 2006 Daniel Barenboim, In the Beginning was Sound
 2007 Jeffrey Sachs, Bursting at the Seams
 2008 Professor Jonathan Spence, Chinese Vistas
 2009 Michael Sandel, A New Citizenship

2010s 

 2010 Martin Rees, Scientific Horizons
 2011 Aung San Suu Kyi and Baroness Manningham-Buller, Securing Freedom
 2012 Niall Ferguson, The Rule of Law and Its Enemies
 2013 Grayson Perry, Playing to the Gallery
 2014 Atul Gawande, The Future of Medicine
 2015 Stephen Hawking's lecture was postponed because of illness
 2016 (March) Stephen Hawking, Do Black Holes Have No Hair? 
2016 (October) Kwame Anthony Appiah, Mistaken Identities
 2017 Hilary Mantel, Resurrection: The Art And Craft
 2018 Margaret MacMillan, The Mark of Cain
2019 Jonathan Sumption, Law and the Decline of Politics

2020s 
2020 Mark Carney, How We Get What We Value - From Moral to Market Sentiments
2021 Stuart J. Russell, Living with Artificial Intelligence
2022 The Four Freedoms: Chimamanda Ngozi Adichie, "Freedom of speech"; Rowan Williams, "Freedom of worship"; Darren McGarvey, "Freedom from want"; Fiona Hill, "Freedom from fear"

References

External links

 
 History
 Listen to archived lectures

1948 establishments in the United Kingdom
1948 radio programme debuts
Annual events in the United Kingdom
BBC Radio 4 programmes
BBC World Service programmes
Lecture series
Radio-related lists